Sandla may refer to the following places :

 Sandla, Estonia, a village in Estonia
 Sandla, India, a thikana of thakorate Multhan jagir (both Rajput-held), under Dhar State, in present day Madhya Pradesh
 Sandla, Mbabane, a neighborhood of Mbabane, Eswatini

See also
 Sandlas, a surname